Alopecosa psammophila is a wolf spider species  in the genus Alopecosa found in the Czech Republic, Slovakia, Hungary, Romania and Russia.

See also 
 List of Lycosidae species

References

External links 

psammophila
Spiders of Europe
Spiders of Russia
Spiders described in 2001